Koolewong is a suburb of the Central Coast region of New South Wales, Australia between Gosford and Woy Woy, and is mostly on a hill overlooking Brisbane Water. It is part of the  local government area.

The suburb contains Koolewong railway station, which is on the Main North railway line.

The land around Koolewong is flat to the southeast, but to the northwest it is hilly. The highest point in the vicinity has an elevation of 150 meters and is 1.0 km south of Koolewong. The nearest larger town is Umina, 6.5 km south of Koolewong. In the region around Koolewong, coves, bays, and beaches are unusually common.

History

Koolewong is a local Aboriginal word for Koala.

Koolewong was originally known as "Glenrock" but the name Koolewong was selected by the NSW Railways for the station and the locality subsequently also became known as Koolewong.

At the 2021 Census, the population of Koolewong was 920, an increase from the 871 recorded in 2016.

In February 2017, the Koolewong Marina was opened.

References

Suburbs of the Central Coast (New South Wales)